Joseph Claude Prater (November 19, 1922 – August 1, 2004) was an American minor league baseball player and a college football coach. He served as the head football coach at Colorado State University–Pueblo from 1956 to 1973.

References

External links
 
 Greater Pueblo Sports Hall of Fame profile

1922 births
2004 deaths
CSU Pueblo ThunderWolves football coaches
Olean Oilers players
Oshkosh Giants players
Sanford Spinners players
High school basketball coaches in Colorado
High school football coaches in Colorado
People from Madison County, Arkansas
Sportspeople from Fayetteville, Arkansas
Baseball players from Arkansas